Dame Fiona Claire Reynolds  (born 29 March 1958) is a British former civil servant and chair of the National Audit Office. She was previously Master of Emmanuel College, Cambridge and Director-General of the National Trust. 
She is the current Chair of the Governing Council at the Royal Agricultural University, Cirencester.

Early life
Reynolds was born on 29 March 1958, in Alston, Cumbria, England. From 1969 to 1976, she was educated at Rugby High School for Girls, an all-girls grammar school in Rugby, Warwickshire. She studied geography and land economy at Newnham College, Cambridge. She graduated from the University of Cambridge with a first class Bachelor of Arts (BA) degree in 1979; as per tradition, her BA was later promoted to a Master of Arts (MA Cantab) degree. From 1980 to 1981, she undertook postgraduate study at the University of Cambridge. She graduated with a Master of Philosophy (MPhil) degree in land economy; a Cambridge MPhil is equivalent to a taught Master of Arts degree from non-ancient universities.

Career
Reynolds held senior positions in the Council for National Parks and the Campaign for Rural England before joining the Cabinet Office as Director of the Women's Unit in 1998. She was appointed Commander of the Order of the British Empire (CBE) in 1998.

She became Director General of the National Trust in 2001. During her tenure, membership of the charity, which looks after  of land in the United Kingdom, grew from 2.7 to 4 million people. In February 2010 she was a guest on Private Passions, the biographical music discussion programme on BBC Radio 3. Her appearance on the Chris Evans Breakfast Show on 18 February 2010 added momentum to the campaign to "save" Abbey Road studios.

It was announced in March 2012 that Reynolds would be stepping down as Director-General of the National Trust to become the next Master of Emmanuel College, Cambridge, in succession to Lord Wilson of Dinton. She was admitted to her new post in October 2012, although was granted a leave of absence until October 2013. She was awarded the degree of Honorary Doctor of Science by the University of Warwick in January 2013. Reynolds was chair of the judging panel for the Wainright Prize for nature writing in 2016, and in 2017 published her own book, The Fight for Beauty: Our Path to a Better Future. In 2016 Reynolds succeeded Julia Bradbury as President of the Friends of the Peak District.

In July 2020, the government announced that Reynolds had been appointed as the next chair of the National Audit Office (United Kingdom), a position she took up in January 2021. She was succeeded as Master of Emmanuel College by Douglas Chalmers in October 2021. She is also a Companion of the Guild of St George.

It was announced in January 2022 that she was to become the Chair of Governing Council at the Royal Agricultural University in Cirencester.

Non-executive directorships
Reynolds became a non-executive director of the BBC in January 2012 and Senior Independent Director in December 2012. She also joined the board of Wessex Water as a non-executive director in August 2012.

Recognition 

Reynolds was appointed Dame Commander of the Order of the British Empire (DBE) in the 2008 New Year Honours for "services to heritage and conservation". In 2019 she was awarded the Royal Geographical Society's Patron’s Medal "for her contribution to environmental protection, conservation and the preservation of the British landscape".

Personal life
She married Robert Merrill in 1981, in Rugby. Together, they have three daughters.

References

External links
 The Guardian article on Reynolds
 Podcast interview with Dame Fiona on the occasion of her being awarded the degree of Honorary Doctor of Science by the University of Warwick in January 2013

1958 births
Dames Commander of the Order of the British Empire
Living people
Alumni of Newnham College, Cambridge
Fellows of Newnham College, Cambridge
People from Rugby, Warwickshire
People from Alston, Cumbria
People educated at Rugby High School for Girls
Masters of Emmanuel College, Cambridge
Civil servants in the Cabinet Office
National Trust people
Guild of St George
Recipients of the Royal Geographical Society Patron's Medal
Honorary Fellows of the British Academy